The following is a list of players, both past and current, who appeared at least in one game for the Los Angeles Angels American League franchise (1961–1965; 2016–present), also known previously as the California Angels (1965–1996), Anaheim Angels (1997–2004) and Los Angeles Angels of Anaheim (2005–2015).

Players in Bold are members of the National Baseball Hall of Fame.

Players in Italics have had their numbers retired by the team.


A

Don Aase
Jim Abbott
Kyle Abbott
Shawn Abner
Bobby Abreu
A.J. Achter
Ricky Adams
Joe Adcock
Nick Adenhart
Willie Aikens
Al Albuquerque
Mike Aldrete
Cory Aldridge
Edgardo Alfonzo
Luis Alicea
Andy Allanson
Cody Allen
Lloyd Allen
Bob Allietta
Sandy Alomar Sr.
José Álvarez
Juan Alvarez
Orlando Álvarez
Alexi Amarista
Rubén Amaro
Rubén Amaro Jr.
Alfredo Amézaga
Brian Anderson
Garret Anderson
Jim Anderson
Kent Anderson
Matt Andriese
Kevin Appier
Dan Ardell
George Arias
Tony Armas
José Arredondo
Ken Aspromonte
Earl Averill Jr.
Erick Aybar
Joe Azcue

B

Stan Bahnsen
Scott Bailes
Ed Bailey
John Balaz
Floyd Bannister
Steve Barber
Mike Barlow
Larry Barnes
Jim Barr
Justin Baughman
Don Baylor
Chris Beasley
Julio Bécquer
Tim Belcher
Bo Belinsky
Trevor Bell
Clay Bellinger
Juan Beníquez
Dennis Bennett
Erik Bennett
Dusty Bergman
Ken Berry
Dante Bichette
Mike Bielecki
Steve Bilko
Steve Blateric
Bert Blyleven
Bruce Bochte
Frank Bolick
Bobby Bonds
Bob Boone
Chris Bootcheck
Pedro Borbón
Pat Borders
Toby Borland
Shawn Boskie
Thad Bosley
Lyman Bostock
Kent Bottenfield
Ralph Botting
Bob Botz
Peter Bourjos
Mike Bovee
Ted Bowsfield
Tom Bradley
Brian Brady
Russell Branyan
Ken Brett
Jim Brewer
Fritz Brickell
Rocky Bridges
Dan Briggs
Bobby Brooks
Hubie Brooks
Curt Brown
Matthew Brown
Mike Brown
Randy Brown
Steve Brown
Tom Brunansky
George Brunet
T.R. Bryden
Bill Buckner
Ryan Budde
DeWayne Buice
Jason Bulger
Lew Burdette
Tom Burgess
Tom Burgmeier
Jamie Burke
Leo Burke
Rick Burleson
Mike Butcher
Paul Byrd

C

Orlando Cabrera
Greg Cadaret
Kole Calhoun
Alberto Callaspo
Mickey Callaway
Bert Campaneris
John Candelaria
John Caneira
José Cardenal
Leo Cárdenas
Rod Carew
David Carpenter
Héctor Carrasco
Jerry Casale
Bobby Cassevah
Wayne Causey
Bob Cerv
Ray Chadwick
Dave Chalk
Bob Chance
Dean Chance
Tyler Chatwood
Anthony Chavez
Bruce Christensen
Jason Christiansen
Pete Cimino
Gino Cimoli
Bobby Clark
Rickey Clark
Terry Clark
Mark Clear
Edgard Clemente
Pat Clements
Tex Clevenger
Stan Cliburn
Stew Cliburn
Lou Clinton
Pete Coachman
Jim Coates
Mike Colangelo
Chris Coletta
Dave Collins
Bartolo Colón
Hank Conger
Tony Conigliaro
Billy Consolo
Dennis Cook
Mike Cook
Brian Cooper
Doug Corbett
Sherman Corbett
Rod Correia
Chuck Cottier
Marlan Coughtry
Billy Cowan
Al Cowens
Terry Cox
Chuck Crim
Chris Cron
Todd Cruz
Mike Cuéllar
John Cumberland
Chad Curtis
John Curtis

D

John D'Acquisto
Paul Dade
Mark Dalesandro
Bobby Darwin
Vic Davalillo
Jeff DaVanon
Jerry DaVanon
Daniel Davidson
Alvin Davis
Bob Davis
Chili Davis
Doug Davis
Mark Davis
Tommy Davis
Willie Davis
Doug DeCinces
Steve Decker
Charlie Dees
Wilson Delgado
Rich DeLucia
Jason Dickson
Frank Dimichele
Gary DiSarcina
Chuck Dobson
John Doherty
Brendan Donnelly
Jim Donohue
Tom Donohue
John Dopson
Brian Dorsett
Jim Dorsey
Brian Downing
Scott Downs
Denny Doyle
Paul Doyle
Dick Drago
Rob Ducey
Tom Dukes
Bob Duliba
Scott Dunn
Steve Dunning
Ryne Duren
Trent Durrington

E

Mike Easler
Damion Easley
David Eckstein
Steve Eddy
Ken Edenfield
Jim Edmonds
Robert Eenhoorn
Dick Egan
Tom Egan
Mark Eichhorn
Robert Ellis
Sammy Ellis
Angelo Encarnación
Barry Enright
Jim Eppard
Mike Epstein
Darin Erstad
Kelvim Escobar
Andy Etchebarren
Seth Etherton
Terry Evans

F

Jorge Fábregas
Ron Fairly
John Farrell
Sal Fasano
Junior Félix
Joe Ferguson
José Fernández
Bob Ferris
Mike Fetters
Cecil Fielder
Chone Figgins
Ed Figueroa
Jack Fimple
Chuck Finley
Steve Finley
Todd Fischer
Eddie Fisher
Mike Fitzgerald
Al Fitzmorris
David Fletcher
Kevin Flora
Gil Flores
Hank Foiles
Tim Foli
Dan Ford
Ken Forsch
Terry Forster
Tim Fortugno
Alan Foster
Art Fowler
Alan Fowlkes
Paul Foytack
Kevin Frandsen
Willie Fraser
Jim Fregosi
Steve Frey
Ernesto Frieri
Todd Frohwirth
Dave Frost
Brian Fuentes
Brad Fullmer
Mike Fyhrie

G

Len Gabrielson
Gary Gaetti
Andrés Galarraga
Al Gallagher
Dave Gallagher
Ron Gant
Carlos García
Miguel García
Jon Garland
Ralph Garr
Adrian Garrett
Greg Garrett
Ned Garver
Aubrey Gatewood
Vern Geishert
Steve Geltz
Craig Gerber
Benji Gil
Bill Gilbreth
Troy Glaus
Gary Glover
Greg Gohr
Dave Goltz
Larry Gonzales
Rene Gonzales
José González
Tony González
Danny Goodwin
Nick Gorneault
Julio Gotay
Billy Grabarkewitz
Joe Grahe
Eli Grba
Craig Grebeck
Lenny Green
Steve Green
Todd Greene
Kevin Gregg
Tom Gregorio
Zack Greinke
Bobby Grich
Doug Griffin
Tom Griffin
Jason Grimsley
Kevin Gross
Kelly Gruber
Mark Gubicza
Mario Guerrero
Vladimir Guerrero 
José Guillén
Marcus Gwyn

H

John Habyan
Ed Halicki
Jimmie Hall
Shane Halter
Jack Hamilton
Ken Hamlin
Ike Hampton
Ryan Hancock
Rich Hand
Dan Haren
Mike Harkey
Larry Harlow
Brian Harper
Tommy Harper
Bill Harrelson
John Harris
Pep Harris
Paul Hartzell
Bryan Harvey
Shigetoshi Hasegawa
Andy Hassler
Hilly Hathaway
LaTroy Hawkins
Von Hayes
Nathan Haynes
Bob Heffner
Bob Heise
Woodie Held
Russ Heman
Bret Hemphill
Rickey Henderson
George Hendrick
Matt Hensley
Jackie Hernández
Ed Herrmann
John Hester
Jack Hiatt
Jim Hibbs
Jim Hicks
Donnie Hill
Glenallen Hill
Ken Hill
Shea Hillenbrand
Brett Hinchliffe
Chuck Hinton
Butch Hobson
Chuck Hockenbery
Glenn Hoffman
Al Holland
Dave Hollins
Mike Holtz
Mark Holzemer
Doug Howard
Jack Howell
Rex Hudler
Charlie Hudson
Terry Humphrey
Ken Hunt
Torii Hunter
Jeff Huson

I

Chris Iannetta
Raisel Iglesias
Jason Isringhausen
Maicer Izturis

J

Bo Jackson
Reggie Jackson
Ron Jackson
Johnny James
Mike James
Stan Javier
Gregg Jefferies
Jesse Jefferson
Kevin Jepsen
Tommy John
Alex Johnson
Gary Johnson
Keith Johnson
Lou Johnson
Mark Johnson
Jay Johnstone
Bob Jones
Greg Jones
Ruppert Jones
Wally Joyner
Jeff Juden

K

Scott Karl
Curt Kaufman
Scott Kazmir
Steve Kealey
Pat Keedy
Mick Kelleher
Bill Kelso
Howie Kendrick
Adam Kennedy
Dave Kingman
Bob Kipper
Ed Kirkpatrick
Don Kirkwood
Bruce Kison
Ron Kline
Ted Kluszewski
Chris Knapp
Bobby Knoop
Michael Kohn
Joe Koppe
Andy Kosco
Frank Kostro
Casey Kotchman
Ray Krawczyk
Chad Kreuter
Gil Kubski
Fred Kuhaulua
Art Kusnyer

L

Bob Lacey
John Lackey
Frank LaCorte
Joe Lahoud
Ken Landreaux
Dick Lange
Ryan Langerhans
Mark Langston
Carney Lansford
Maddie robison

Dave LaRoche
Fred Lasher
Barry Latman
Jack Lazorko
Bob Lee
Don Lee
Mike Lee
Gene Leek
Craig Lefferts
Phil Leftwich
Mark Leiter
Frank Leja
Dave Lemanczyk
Al Levine
Scott Lewis
Jim Leyritz
Rufino Linares
José Lind
Doug Linton
Winston Llenas
Bobby Locke
Skip Lockwood
Carlos López
Marcelino López
Ramón López
Andrew Lorraine
Vance Lovelace
Torey Lovullo
Steve Lubratich
Gary Lucas
Urbano Lugo
Mark Lukasiewicz
Matt Luke
Keith Luuloa
Shane Loux
Fred Lynn
Barry Lyons

M

Dave Machemer
Tony Mack
Mike Magnante
Joe Magrane
Mickey Mahler
Jim Maloney
Frank Malzone
Nick Maronde
Mike Marshall
Norberto Martin
Alfredo Martínez
Carlos Martínez
Damon Mashore
Jeff Mathis
Dave Matranga
Hideki Matsui
Gary Matthews Jr.
Carlos May
Darrell May
Rudy May
Paul McAnulty
Ken McBride
Kirk McCaskill
Bob McClure
Tommy McCraw
Jack McDowell
Chuck McElroy
Orlando McFarlane
Jim McGlothlin
Byron McLaughlin
Mark McLemore
Ken McMullen
Dallas McPherson
Bill Melton
Rudy Meoli
Kent Mercker
Lou Merloni
Andy Messersmith
Bob Meyer
Bart Miadich
Mike Miley
Darrell Miller
Dyar Miller
Rick Miller
Brad Mills
Don Mincher
Greg Minton
Steve Mintz
Ron Moeller
Bengie Molina
José Molina
Raúl Mondesí
Sid Monge
John Montague
Willie Montañez
Aurelio Monteagudo
Rich Monteleone
Balor Moore
Donnie Moore
Jeremy Moore
Kendrys Morales
Billy Moran
Ángel Moreno
José Moreno
Tom Morgan
John Morris
Bubba Morton
Robert Mosebach
Dustin Moseley
Jerry Moses
Curt Motton
Rance Mulliniks
Tom Murphy
Tommy Murphy
Eddie Murray
Greg Myers

N

Mike Napoli
Jerry Narron
Chris Nelson
Efren Navarro
Julio Navarro
Gene Nelson
Mel Nelson
Morris Nettles
Phil Nevin
Fred Newman
Jerry Nielsen
Kirk Nieuwenhuis
José Nieves
Junior Noboa
Gary Nolan
Tim Nordbrook
Joe Nuxhall

O

Mike O'Berry
Charlie O'Brien
Syd O'Brien
Darren O'Day
Sean O'Sullivan
Ken Oberkfell
Alex Ochoa
Shohei Ohtani
Omar Olivares
Bob Oliver
Darren Oliver
Anthony Ortega
Phil Ortega
Ramón Ortiz
John Orton
Dan Osinski
Ed Ott
Mike Overy
Spike Owen
Eric Owens
Ray Oyler

P

Joe Pactwa
Orlando Palmeiro
Matt Palmer
Billy Parker
Dave Parker
Lance Parrish
Freddie Patek
Bob Patterson
Ken Patterson
Marty Pattin
Josh Paul
David Pauley
Albie Pearson
Orlando Peña
Brad Pennington
Joel Peralta
Troy Percival
Eduardo Pérez
Marty Perez
Matt Perisho
Ron Perranoski
Bob Perry
Mark Petkovsek
Dan Petry
Gary Pettis
Chris Pettit
Tony Phillips
Rob Picciolo
Ron Piché
Jim Piersall
Horacio Piña
Joel Piñeiro
Vada Pinson
Gus Polidor
Luis Polonia
Lou Pote
Vic Power
Bob Priddy
Curtis Pride
Chris Prieto
Bret Prinz
Chris Pritchett
Albert Pujols

Q

Mel Queen Jr.
Robb Quinlan
Luis Quintana

R

Horacio Ramírez
Julio Ramírez
Orlando Ramírez
Domingo Ramos
Merritt Ranew
Pat Rapp
Doug Rau
Johnny Ray
Barry Raziano
Joe Redfield
Howie Reed
Rick Reichardt
Jerry Remy
Steve Renko
Roger Repoz
Chris Resop
Merv Rettenmund
Jerry Reuss
Archie Reynolds
Harold Reynolds
Tommie Reynolds
Del Rice
Garrett Richards
Jeff Richardson
Adam Riggs
Juan Rivera
Mickey Rivers
Rich Robertson
Don Robinson
Frank Robinson
Jeff Robinson
Buck Rodgers
Fernando Rodney
Aurelio Rodríguez
Ellie Rodríguez
Fernando Rodriguez
Francisco Rodríguez (Mexico)
Francisco Rodríguez (Venezuela)
Rafael Rodríguez
Rich Rodriguez
Sean Rodriguez
Minnie Rojas
Ron Romanick
J. C. Romero
Andrew Romine
Phil Roof
Bobby Rose
Don Rose
Gary Ross
Jorge Rubio
Joe Rudi
Vern Ruhle
Chico Ruiz
Mark Ryal
Michael Ryan
Nolan Ryan

S

Bob Sadowski
Ed Sadowski
Tim Salmon
Bill Sampen
Luis Sánchez
Ken Sanders
Scott Sanderson
Freddy Sandoval
Charlie Sands
Jack Sanford
Ervin Santana
Tom Satriano
Joe Saunders
Paul Schaal
Richie Scheinblum
Jeff Schmidt
Scott Schoeneweis
Dick Schofield
Bill Schroeder
Rick Schu
Dave Schuler
Jeff Schwarz
Daryl Sconiers
Darryl Scott
Mickey Scott
Jean Segura
Aaron Sele
Dave Sells
Dick Selma
Ray Semproch
Alex Serrano
Harvey Shank
Andy Sheets
Larry Sherry
Scot Shields
Craig Shipley
Costen Shockley
Norm Siebern
Tom Silverio
Dave Silvestri
Curt Simmons
Dick Simpson
Wayne Simpson
Bill Singer
Dave Skaggs
Bill Skowron
Jim Slaton
Don Slaught
Billy Smith
Bob Smith
Dave Smith
Dwight Smith
Lee Smith
Willie Smith
J. T. Snow
Luis Sojo
Tony Solaita
Zach Sorensen
Liván Soto
Al Spangler
Steve Sparks
Justin Speier
Jim Spencer
Scott Spiezio
Jack Spring
Dennis Springer
Russ Springer
Bob Sprout
Leroy Stanton
Rick Steirer
Rick Stelmaszek
John Stephenson
Lee Stevens
Kurt Stillwell
Kevin Stocker
Brian Stokes
Bill Stoneman
Dick Stuart
Moose Stubing
Bill Sudakis
Ed Sukla
Don Sutton
Craig Swan
Paul Swingle

T

Hisanori Takahashi
Frank Tanana
Chuck Tanner
Jarvis Tatum
Ken Tatum
Andrew Taylor
Hawk Taylor
Mark Teixeira
Derrel Thomas
George Thomas
Lee Thomas
Jason Thompson
Rich Thompson
Dickie Thon
Faye Throneberry
Luis Tiant
Ron Tingley
Jeff Torborg
Félix Torres
Rusty Torres
Bill Travers
Bobby Treviño
Mike Trout
Mark Trumbo
Bob Turley
Derrick Turnbow
Chris Turner
Ken Turner

U

Tim Unroe

V

Ismael Valdéz
Bobby Valentine
Ellis Valentine
Fernando Valenzuela
Julio Valera
Ty Van Burkleo
Ben Van Ryn
Mo Vaughn
Randy Velarde
Gil Velazquez
Max Venable
John Verhoeven
Charlie Vinson
Bill Voss

W

Leon Wagner
Matt Walbeck
Jordan Walden
Jim Walewander
Chico Walker
Tom Walker
Donne Wall
Don Wallace
Tim Wallach
Jared Walsh
Jerome Walton
Dick Wantz
Bryan Ward
Jackie Warner
Greg Washburn
Jarrod Washburn
Claudell Washington
Allen Watson
Eric Weaver
Jeff Weaver
Jered Weaver
Jim Weaver
Ben Weber
Vernon Wells
Johnny Werhas
Barry Wesson
Gary Wheelock
Devon White
Dan Whitmer
Rob Wilfong
Hoyt Wilhelm
Nick Willhite
Jerome Williams
Mitch Williams
Reggie Williams
Shad Williams
Reggie Willits
Terry Wilshusen
Bobby Wilson
C. J. Wilson
Tack Wilson
Trevor Wilson
Gordie Windhorn
Dave Winfield
Matt Wise
George Witt
Mike Witt
Wally Wolf
Brandon Wood
Jake Woods
Shawn Wooten
Clyde Wright
Butch Wynegar
Billy Wynne

Y

Esteban Yan
Eddie Yost
Cliff Young

Z

Geoff Zahn

External links
BR batting statistics
BR pitching statistics
 

 
Major League Baseball all-time rosters
Roster